Light oil may refer to:

Light fuel oil produced through distillation.
Light crude oil, which is less viscous than intermediate and heavy crude oil.
Cycle oil, a light lubricating oil